Kovanoluk can refer to:

 Kovanoluk, Buldan
 Kovanoluk, Samsat